Felix Tikotin (12 October 1893 – 15 August 1986) was an architect, art collector, and founder of the first Museum of Japanese Art in the Middle East.

Life 
Born in Glogau, Germany, to a Jewish family, his ancestors had returned with Napoleon from Russia from a town called Tykocin. Tikotin grew up in Dresden and became involved with the artistic group of "Die Bruecke". Tikotin began collecting art in high school. He wanted to study painting but became an architect.
 
In World War I, he was an officer in the German army, fighting first on the Western front in Belgium and later in the East. He was awarded the Iron Cross, 2nd Class. After the war, he travelled to Japan on the Trans-Siberia Express. He fell in love with Japanese culture and in April 1927, he opened his own gallery in Berlin.

During World War II, Felix Tikotin settled in the Netherlands. His two daughters were born in The Hague, where he had a gallery in his house. After the invasion of the Nazis, the family moved away from the coast and then, when things became worse for the Jews, the Dutch Resistance helped to find them hiding places. The entire family survived, and the collection was hidden by honest neighbours but was stolen during the war years.

Tikotin slowly resumed his activities as a dealer in Japanese art. He became, once again, very successful and prominent. He held exhibitions all over Europe and the United States. In 1955 he organised the first overseas exhibition of the origami by Akira Yoshizawa (in the Stedelijk Museum of Amsterdam). He also did much to introduce to the West ikebana and some other Japanese "specialities".

When Tikotin first visited Israel in 1956, he decided that the major part of his collection really belonged in that country. He helped to build the first exhibition hall and buy the Kisch House in Haifa. In 1960, the Tikotin Museum of Japanese Art was opened.

References

1893 births
1986 deaths
20th-century German architects
German art collectors
20th-century art collectors
German Jewish military personnel of World War I
Museum founders
Jewish emigrants from Nazi Germany to the Netherlands
Holocaust survivors
People from Głogów